

Men's 200 m Breaststroke - Final

Men's 200 m Breaststroke - Heats

Men's 200 m Breaststroke - Heat 01

Men's 200 m Breaststroke - Heat 02

Men's 200 m Breaststroke - Heat 03

Swimming at the 2006 Commonwealth Games